Axel Gustaf Emanuel Hultgren, (November 16, 1886 – May 15, 1974) was a Swedish metallurgist.
Hultgren is perhaps most famous for his work on tungsten steels, and the transformation of Austenite.

Hultgren was born near Kalmar, Sweden and studied metallurgy at the Royal Institute of Technology in Stockholm, Sweden. Following his MSc and some temporary positions in teaching, industry and a research visit in Berlin under Prof. H. Hanemann, Hultgren joined SKF bearing company in Gothenburg as a manager for the heat treatment and later as a metallurgist. In 1920 he published his monograph on tungsten steels. Later, in 1937 he became the first Metallography Professor at the Institute.

His focus was to combine experimental methods and metallographic observation with theoretical reasoning, in a deductive way.

Hultgren was elected a member of the Royal Swedish Academy of Engineering Sciences in 1930 and of the Royal Swedish Academy of Sciences in 1945.

References
 Erik Rudberg (1975). ”Axel Hultgren in memoriam”. Jernkontorets Annaler 159: 39-42.

Selected works
Hultgren, A., 1920, A metallographic study of tungsten steels, John Wiley & Sons.
Hultgren, A., 1947, Isothermal transformation of Austenite. Transactions of the ASM, 39, 915-989

1886 births
1974 deaths
Swedish metallurgists
People from Kalmar
KTH Royal Institute of Technology alumni
Academic staff of the KTH Royal Institute of Technology
Members of the Royal Swedish Academy of Engineering Sciences
Members of the Royal Swedish Academy of Sciences
20th-century Swedish people